The National Westminster Bank building in Barrow-in-Furness, Cumbria, England is located at the intersection of Abbey Road and Duke Street. It was designed by Paley and Austin architects and built between 1873–74 and has been designated a Grade II listed building by English Heritage. Built for the Lancaster branch of the National Westminster Bank it was a major component of the Ramsden Square scheme, one of the planned town's two main squares and focal points. It is one of three former 'Nat West' properties with listed building status in the Borough and currently houses a carpet shop in the lower floors.

See also
 Listed buildings in Barrow-in-Furness

References

National Westminster Bank
Grade II listed banks
National Westminster Bank, Barrow
National Westminster Bank, Barrow
NatWest Group